Kamenar may refer to:

Kamenar, Burgas Province, Bulgaria
Kamenar, Varna Province, Bulgaria
Kamenar Point, Antarctica
Kamenar (surname)